Castle Bruce is a village on the east coast of Dominica. It is the largest settlement in St. David Parish, with a population of 1,339.

References

External links

Populated places in Dominica